Qäwi Näcmi (1901–1957) was a Soviet-Tatar poet, translator, and journalist.

Biography 
Qäwi Näcmi was born on December 2 (15), 1901 in the village of Qızıl Ataw (Krasny Ostrov) in muezzin's family . From 1910 he lived in Aktyubinsk, where his parents moved; he worked as a laborer on a farm (1913-1915), then as a packer at a soap factory (1916-1917). Here in 1917 he graduated from the Russian-Tatar school.

In 1917-1919 he worked as a teacher in his native village. In 1919-1939, Qäwi Näcmi was a Red Army soldier, cadet, teacher, commissar of a military school and executive editor of the district Red Army newspaper. In 1933–1934 was the chief editor of  magazine.

At the First All-Union Congress of Soviet Writers in 1934, Näcmi was elected a member of the board of the Union of Soviet Writers. In 1934-1937 he was the first chairman of the board of the Union of Writers of Tatar Autonomous Soviet Socialist Republic. Since 1937 - a professional writer. 

Removed from all positions and arrested in 1937 on charges of «preparing a military counter-revolutionary rebellion». Sentenced to 10 years in prison, but in 1939 the case was dismissed for lack of evidence, and Näcmi was released.

In 1942–1945 worked as head of the agitation and propaganda department of the Tatar Republican Committee for Radio and Broadcasting under the Council of People's Commissars of the TASSR, in 1947–1949 in the editorial office of  magazine. 

Qäwi Näcmi died on March 24, 1957 in Kazan. He was buried at Kazan's  next to Salix Säydäş and Qäyüm Nasıyri.

Works 
Collections of poems: Öyermälär (Өермәләр, Whirlwinds 1925), Atakağa (Атакага, To the attack, 1942), novels: Şobağa (Шобага, Lot, 1926), Yar buyındağı uçaqlar (Яр буендагы учаклар, Coastal Fires, 1929, both about the Civil War in Russia), Yaqtı suqmaq (Якты сукмак, Bright Path, 1926), about collectivization), the historical-revolutionary novel Yazğı cillär (Язгы җилләр, Spring Winds, 1950; for the last one he was awarded USSR State Prize in 1951).

Translated into Tatar works of Alexander Pushkin, Mikhail Lermontov, Alexander Blok, Samuil Marshak, Ivan Franko and others; also translated Musa Сälil's Moabit Notebooks into Russian.

Näcmi's complete works in 4 volumes were published in 1981-1984.

Family and relatives 
Their son , was a university professor. Näcmi's brother  was a chess player.

His uncle, was an imam and State Duma deputy.

References

External links 

Tatar journalists
Tatar poets